Onur Karakabak (born 8 April 1992) is a Turkish footballer who plays for Karacabey Belediyespor.

Career 
He has played at Sakaryaspor all his life but only featuring in youth leagues. In the season 2007-2008 he had 19 appearances in the Deplasmanlı Süper Gençler Lig where he bagged 5 goals. He has also featured in the DSGL Turkey Champions with 3 appearances.

He signed a three-year contract for Fenerbahçe on 15 January 2009, but was allowed to see out the rest of the season at Sakaryaspor. During the second half of the 2009-2010 season he was loaned to TFF First League team Mersin İdmanyurdu. In June 2010 he was included in the summer camp squad by Fenerbahçe's manager Aykut Kocaman.  After a strong season at Mersin İdmanyurdu he was sent to Manisaspor on loan.

On 3 August 2012, he joined Samsunspor on loan for the 2012-13 season.

International 
Onur made his international début for Turkey U-15 where he played 3 international friendlies. He was then called up to Turkey U-16 and featured in the Nike Tournament, Easter Tournament and the Viktor Bannikov Tournament. He then moved on to Turkey U-17 where he has appeared in 2 international friendlies, and four "FIFA U17 World Cup" games. In 2010, he was capped in Turkey U-19 national team in "UEFA European Championship Finals 2009-2010" and played three games.

References

External links
 
 
 

1992 births
Sportspeople from Zonguldak
Living people
Turkish footballers
Turkey youth international footballers
Association football defenders
Sakaryaspor footballers
Fenerbahçe S.K. footballers
Mersin İdman Yurdu footballers
Manisaspor footballers
Gaziosmanpaşaspor footballers
Bandırmaspor footballers
Kahramanmaraşspor footballers
Pendikspor footballers
Nazilli Belediyespor footballers
Karacabey Belediyespor footballers
Süper Lig players
TFF First League players
TFF Second League players
TFF Third League players